Laikipia may refer to:

Laikipiak people, were a community that inhabited the plateau located on the eastern escarpment of the Rift Valley in Kenya that today bears their name
Laikipia County, a Kenyan county, located on the Equator in the former Rift Valley Province of the country
Laikipia East Constituency
Laikipia North Constituency
Laikipia West Constituency
Laikipia Air Base
Laikipia University

Others
Laikipia (duo), British-American electronic duo made up of Xander Rawlins and Taylor Harrison